Calocoris is a genus of true bugs in the Miridae family.

Species

References

Further reading 
 Rosenzweig, V. Ye. (1997) "Revised classification of the Calocoris complex and related genera (Heteroptera: Miridae)". Zoosystematica Rossica 6, pp. 139–169.

Miridae genera
Mirini
Taxa named by Franz Xaver Fieber
Articles containing video clips